Ivel Springs is a 15.4 hectare Local Nature Reserve in Baldock in Hertfordshire. It is owned and managed by North Hertfordshire District Council, assisted by the Friends of Baldock Green Spaces.

The site, which was a rubbish dump until the 1950s, has habitats including woodland, wetland and pasture. Its springs are the source of the River Ivel, and they have a wide variety of wildlife.
The Site was awarded Green Flag status in 2016, 2017 and 2018.

There is vehicle access to the site from North Road, and pedestrian access from Norton Road and Icknield Way (via a tunnel under the railway embankment.

References

Local Nature Reserves in Hertfordshire
Baldock